Ministry of Transport and Civil Aviation may refer to:
Ministry of Transport and Civil Aviation (Afghanistan), the aviation regulation body in Afghanistan
Ministry of Transport and Civil Aviation (Sri Lanka), the central government ministry of Sri Lanka responsible for transport
Ministry of Transport and Civil Aviation (United Kingdom), in existence from 1953 to 1959, now the Department for Transport